This is a list of Notre Dame Fighting Irish football season records. The Notre Dame Fighting Irish football team is the football team of the University of Notre Dame, Indiana, United States.  The team competes as an Independent at the NCAA Football Bowl Subdivision level.

Notre Dame has the most consensus national championships and has produced more All-Americans than any other Football Bowl Subdivision school.  Additionally, seven Fighting Irish football players have won the Heisman Trophy.

Notre Dame is one of only two Catholic universities that field a team in the Football Bowl Subdivision, the other being Boston College, and one of a handful of programs independent of a football conference.  The team plays its home games on Notre Dame's campus at Notre Dame Stadium, also known as the "House that Rockne Built," which has a capacity of 80,795.

Notre Dame claims national championships in an additional three seasons, for a total of 11 consensus national championships.  Notre Dame, however, is often credited with 13 national championships in total.  The 1938 and 1953 seasons are the reason for the discrepancy.  In 1938, 8-1 Notre Dame was awarded the national championship by the Dickinson System, while Texas Christian (which finished 11-0) was awarded the championship by the Associated Press. In the 1953 season, an undefeated Notre Dame team (9-0-1) was named national champion by every major selector except the AP and UPI (Coaches) polls, where the Irish finished second in both to 10-1 Maryland.  As Notre Dame has a policy of only recognizing AP and Coaches Poll national championships post-1936, the school does not officially recognize the 1938 and 1953 national championships.

Seasons
The following is a list of Notre Dame's all-time season records.

Notes

On November 22, 2016, Notre Dame was forced to vacate all 12 wins from the 2012 season, and all 9 wins from the 2013 season, including their victory in the Pinstripe Bowl. The NCAA rejected their appeal on February 13, 2018.

References

Notre Dame Fighting Irish

Notre Dame Fighting Irish
Notre Dame Fighting Irish football seasons